Kentucky Route 727 (KY 727) is a  state highway in Whitley County, Kentucky, that runs from U.S. Route 25W (US 25W) southwest of Corbin to US 25W in downtown Corbin.

Major intersections

References

0727
0727